Helmut Schimeczek (born 4 April 1938) is a German former footballer who played as a midfielder for Werder Bremen. With Werder Bremen he won the Bundesliga in the 1964–65 season.

Honours 
Werder Bremen
 Bundesliga: 1964–65

References

External links 
 

Living people
1936 births
Footballers from Berlin
German footballers
Association football midfielders
Bundesliga players
SV Werder Bremen players